Marc Odenthal (born 25 January 1991) is a German judoka. He competed at the 2016 Summer Olympics in Rio de Janeiro, in the men's 90 kg. He was defeated by Mashu Baker of Japan in the round of 32.

References

External links
 
 

1991 births
Living people
German male judoka
Olympic judoka of Germany
Judoka at the 2016 Summer Olympics
European Games competitors for Germany
Judoka at the 2015 European Games
20th-century German people
21st-century German people